Ultimate Kenny G is the third greatest hits album by saxophonist Kenny G. It was released by Arista Records in 2003, and reached number 2 on the Contemporary Jazz and Contemporary Jazz Albums charts, and number 42 on the Billboard 200.

Track listing
"Everlasting" - 4:16
"Havana" - 3:58
"Brazil" - 4:11
"What a Wonderful World" - 3:02
"The Look of Love" - 5:32
"Silhouette" - 4:30
"One More Time" ft. Chanté Moore - 4:01
"Theme from Dying Young" - 4:00
"Forever in Love" - 4:57
"We've Saved the Best for Last" ft. Smokey Robinson- 4:20
"Songbird" - 3:59
"Jasmine Flower" - 4:36
"The Girl from Ipanema" ft. Bebel Gilberto - 4:00
"By the Time This Night Is Over" ft. Peabo Bryson - 4:42
"The Champion's Theme" - 4:22
"Don't Make Me Wait for Love" ft. Lenny Williams - 4:05
"The Moment" - 4:41
"My Heart Will Go On" - 4:19
"The Wedding Song" - 3:21

References

2003 greatest hits albums
Albums produced by Walter Afanasieff
Kenny G compilation albums
Arista Records compilation albums